Abigail Mason is an American actress. In 2008, she co-starred in Saving Sarah Cain. For her role, she won the "Grace Award" at the 16th Annual Movieguide Awards.

Career
Since her move, Mason has appeared in projects playing vastly different roles. She played London's rival in The Suite Life of Zack and Cody and an amish orphan in Fox's Saving Sarah Cain. She won the Grace Award, with Bailee Madison, at the 16th annual MovieGuide awards.

Filmography

Film

Television

References

External links

21st-century American actresses
Actresses from Los Angeles
American television actresses
Living people
Year of birth missing (living people)
People from DeWitt, Michigan
Actresses from Michigan
American Christians